The enzyme 2-methylisocitrate dehydratase catalyzes the chemical reaction

(2S,3R)-3-hydroxybutane-1,2,3-tricarboxylate  (Z)-but-2-ene-1,2,3-tricarboxylate + H2O

This enzyme belongs to the family of lyases, specifically the hydro-lyases, which cleave carbon-oxygen bonds.  The systematic name of this enzyme class is (2S,3R)-3-hydroxybutane-1,2,3-tricarboxylate hydro-lyase [(Z)-but-2-ene-1,2,3-tricarboxylate-forming]. This enzyme is also called (2S,3R)-3-hydroxybutane-1,2,3-tricarboxylate hydro-lyase.  This enzyme participates in propanoate metabolism.

References

 
 

EC 4.2.1
Enzymes of unknown structure